Lyuban is a town in Minsk Region, Belarus. It is the administrative center of Lyuban District. As of 2009, its population was 11,256.

History
The town was first mentioned in 1566 and received its town status in 1968.

World War II 
The Nazis occupied the town from July 1941 to June 1944. On August, 1941, 150 to 200 Jews of the village are murdered in a mass execution perpetrated by Germans at a gravel pit near the village of Dubniki.
In September 1941, a ghetto surrounded with barbed wire was created in the west part of the village of Lyuban, near Pervomayiskayia Street. It was guarded by Germans and local policemen. Jews were used as forced, cleaning or repairing roads. On November 8, 1941, 50 Jewish men were shot, as a reprisal action after a partisan attack. On December 4, 1941, the ghetto was liquidated and Jews were murdered.

Geography
Lyuban is located 139 km in south of Minsk, not too far from the borders with the Voblasts of Mogilev and Gomel. It is 58 km far from Salihorsk, 30 from Slutsk and 26 from Staryya Darohi. In north of the town is located the Lyuban Lake and in west, close to Salihorsk suburbs, the mining area of Kaliy. It is not served by railways but the nearest station, in Ureche, is 8 km far from Lyuban center.

Notable residents
 Yeruchom Levovitz (1875–1935), rabbi
 Rakhel Feygenberg (1895–1972), writer
 Moshe Feinstein (1895–1986), rabbi
 Dovid Feinstein (1929–2020), rabbi

References

External links

 Lyuban official website

Towns in Belarus
Populated places in Minsk Region
Lyuban District
Populated places established in 1566
Nowogródek Voivodeship (1507–1795)
Bobruysky Uyezd
Holocaust locations in Belarus